The mawat land doctrine (dead land doctrine) is a doctrine in laws of some middle eastern countries similar to the terra nullius concept in the law of occupation of a land without a sovereign.

History

Origins

The Land Code of 1858 reformed the system of land ownership registering the steppe-type lands as mawat (dead lands) belonging to the state and requiring state permission for cultivation and grazing rights. The Land Code allowed mawat lands to be "revived" by cultivation. Payment was required before title passed to the applicant only in cases where the land improvements were made without permission.

Palestine

After the Mandate for Palestine came into effect in 1920 the territory came under the administration of the colonial British regime, the British set about the task of re-organizing land ownership in Palestine. Before 1921 applicants could gain title of cultivated mawat lands by paying the value of the unimproved land. This ended with the 1921 Mawat Land Ordinance which did not allow ownership rights to be claimed by cultivating the land.

The 1921 law was an important turning point in defining the legal concept of mawat lands. Until then the mawat classification was for lands of marginal agricultural importance located outside the main areas of settlement. The possibility to gain title by cultivation that existed under the Land Code had encouraged improvement and the enlargement of settlements in sparsely populated areas. The 1946 Survey of Palestine by John Valentine Wistar Shaw described the change from mawat lands: "Nowadays, the development of 'waste' land without prior leave from the State is legally a trespass." The only way to gain title to the mawat lands after 1921 was "allocation from the State."

The Bedouin-held lands in the Negev were still entirely unregistered when the partition of Palestine created a Jewish state in Israel. The only lands registered in the Negev during the British Mandate were some 100,000 dunams purchased by Jewish settlers from the Bedouins. Critics of the application of mawat land doctrine by the State of Israel to resolve modern land disputes in the Negev point to this inherent contradiction when assessing the credibility of the State's claims.

Israel
The British never completed their surveys of the Negev and for various reasons most of the mawat lands were still unregistered when the State of Israel was established. The mawat lands became property of the state under Israeli law which continued to administer the land under the pre-existing laws.

The Israeli state considers all the lands of the Negev Bedouins mawat (dead lands) belonging to the Jewish state. After the 1947–1949 Palestine war, the administration of the mawat lands passed to the Israel Land Administration. The few Bedouin remaining in the Negev after the 1947–1949 Palestine war were transferred to a small region of the Negev under military rule known as the Siyag.

When land registrations continued in the Negev in the 1970s it was under modified principles of land settlement. The matter dragged on for several decades with compensation offered in lieu of registering the lands of Bedouin claimants.

The Israeli state began submitting counterclaims against Bedouin claimants in 2004. The modern State practice of claiming Bedouin lands as mawat is sometimes called the "Dead Negev Doctrine".

Israeli courts have consistently upheld the applicability of mawat land doctrine in these disputes. A 2012 Israeli District Court decision registered the Araqib lands
as state property. The Bedouin al-Uqbi tribe appealed the decision but the Beersheba District Court ruled against them. The court ruled that the disputed Araquib lands were mawat (dead lands) and should be registered as state property.

See also

Doctrine of Christian Discovery

References

Land management in the Ottoman Empire
Israeli property law